Goodenia expansa is a species of flowering plant in the family Goodeniaceae and is endemic to Queensland. It is an annual or short-lived perennial herb with narrow elliptic to lance-shaped leaves at the base of the plant, and leafy racemes of pale yellow or cream-coloured flowers.

Description

Taxonomy and naming
Goodenia expansa was first formally described in 2002 by Ailsa E. Holland and T.P. Boyle in the journal  Austrobaileya from specimens collected on Cuddapan Station. The specific epithet (expansa) refers to the spreading habit of the mature plant.

Distribution and habitat
This goodenia grows on sandplain with Corymbia terminalis and species of Triodia near Winton in central Queensland.

Conservation status
Goodenia expansa is listed as of "least concern" under the Queensland Government Nature Conservation Act 1992.

References

 expansa
Flora of Queensland
Plants described in 2002
Endemic flora of Australia